Advaxis Inc. is an American company devoted to the discovery, development and commercialization of immunotherapies based on a technology platform which uses engineered Listeria monocytogenes (aka Lm).  The company is headquartered in Princeton, New Jersey and was incorporated in Delaware in 2006.

The Lm-based platform on which the company's products are based involves the use of attenuated Lm which secrete antigen/adjuvant fusion proteins and stimulate a patient's immune system (specifically their T cells) to mount an immune response to the secreted antigen; if the antigen is specifically found on cancerous cells, then the result aims to be an effective immune response targeting and eliminating the cancer.  Treatments developed using this paradigm are referred to as Lm-LLO immunotherapies.

Today, the Company has over fifteen distinct constructs in various stages of development, directly developed by the Company and through strategic collaborations with centers　such as: the National Cancer Institute, Cancer Research – UK, the Wistar Institute, the University of Pennsylvania, and the Department of Homeland Security among others.

The Company also has a veterinary medicine program that is evaluating an Lm-LLO based immunotherapy in a Phase 1 study in canine osteosarcoma. Source: www.advaxis.com

Corporate history and governance

Beginnings
Advaxis was a Delaware corporation when it was acquired by a shell corporation (in the official SEC sense) in November 2004.  The acquiring company was Great Expectations, which was incorporated in Colorado in June 1987.  The only operating company owned by Great Expectations was Advaxis and in 2004, a month after the acquisition, it changed its name to Advaxis, and 18 months after that it reincorporated as a Delaware corporation.  The official 'date of inception' for the company is 1 March 2002.

Partnerships
In 2014, Advaxis entered a co-development and commercialization agreement with India's Biocon for the ADXS-HPV therapeutic in the Indian market, addressing HPV-associated cancers, including cervical cancer.,

Advaxis Technology
Advaxis immunotherapies are based on a novel platform technology using live attenuated Listeria monocytogenes (Lm) that are bio-engineered to secrete an antigen/adjuvant fusion protein. The vectors infect the key elements of the immune system and the secreted antigen/adjuvant fusion protein redirects the powerful immune response all human beings inherit to Lm against the cancer, itself. The adjuvant also reduces the cancer's defense against this immune attack by 80%.

 The Company's novel platform technology is based on over twenty years of pre-clinical research by Yvonne Paterson, Professor of Microbiology, University of Pennsylvania, and Fellow of the American Academy for the Advancement of Science.

Clinical Development Program
ADXS-HPV is in Phase 2 trials for HPV-associated diseases (cervical intraepithelial neoplasia (CIN), cervical cancer and HPV-associated head and neck cancer).

In 2009 Advaxis published the results of the first Phase 1 trial with the first Lm-LLO based immunotherapy, ADXS-HPV in Vaccine (19 June 2009 / Volume 27, Issue 30).  This study assessed side effects associated with increasing doses of ADXS-HPV in patients with metastatic, refractory, recurrent cervical cancer. Vaccine (19 June 2009 / Volume 27, Issue 30)

 This study demonstrated  for the first time that a live-attenuated Lm-LLO based immunotherapy could be administered to human subjects.
 ADXS-HPV was well tolerated, and a maximum tolerated dose was established.
 4/13 evaluable patients experienced increased survival and tumor shrinkage that merited further investigation.

Veterinary Medicine Program
 Advaxis signed a CRADA (Cooperative Research And Development Agreement) with the Department of Homeland Security. The DHS will initially conduct a pilot “proof-of-concept” study in cattle investigating the safety of proprietary/patented Advaxis immunotherapies.
 Advaxis has begun a Phase 1 study with the University of Pennsylvania School of Veterinary Medicine to evaluate an Lm-LLO based immunotherapy in a Phase 1 study in canine osteosarcoma.

References

Biotechnology companies of the United States
Companies based in Princeton, New Jersey
Companies formerly listed on the Nasdaq
Companies traded over-the-counter in the United States
2002 establishments in New Jersey
Biotechnology companies established in 2002
Immunotherapy